Zammar  is a Syrian village located in Mount Simeon District, Aleppo. According to the Syria Central Bureau of Statistics (CBS), Zammar had a population of 1,919 in the 2004 census. Zammar was previously part of al-Zirbah Subdistrict until 2009, it later became a subdistrict itself.

References 

Populated places in Mount Simeon District